Dr. Gafoor Memorial MES Mampad College, is a general degree college located in Mampad, Malappuram district, Kerala. It was established in the year 1965. The college is autonomous. This college offers different courses in arts, commerce and science.

Notable alumni
 P. V. Abdul Wahab, Member of Rajya Sabha
 Asif Saheer, footballer
 Rahman (actor)
 U.Jimshad, football player
 P. V. Anvar, MLA

See also

References

External links
http://www.mesmampad.org 
University Grants Commission
National Assessment and Accreditation Council

Universities and colleges in Malappuram district
Educational institutions established in 1965
1965 establishments in Kerala
Arts and Science colleges in Kerala
Colleges affiliated with the University of Calicut